"It's Like That" may refer to:

 "It's Like That" (Run–D.M.C. song) (1983)
 "It's Like That" (Mariah Carey song) (2005)
 "It's Like That (My Big Brother)," a Redman song (1996)
 "It's Like That," a song by Pete Rock & CL Smooth
 "It's Like That," a song by Evan Taubenfeld
 "It's Like That," a song by Little Jackie from their album Queen of Prospect Park.